The SGB Championship 2018 was the 2018 season of the second division of Great British speedway. The season ran between March and October 2018 and consisted of 11 teams participating.

Workington Comets completed the treble winning the playoffs, Championship Shield and the Knockout Cup. It was the first league title win since their formation in 1970.

League
Teams face each other two times: once home and once away.

Results

Teams face each other two times: once home and once away.

The following SGB Championship league match was not completed during the league season
Workington Comets Vs Lakeside Hammers

Table

Final SGB Championship League Table Up To And Including Sunday 16 September

Play-offs

Home team scores are in bold
Overall aggregate scores are in red

Semi-finals

Grand final

SGB Championship Knockout Cup
The 2018 SGB Championship Knockout Cup was the 51st edition of the Knockout Cup for tier two teams.

KO Cup stages

Home team scores are in bold
Overall aggregate scores are in red

First round

Quarter-finals

Semi-finals

Final
First leg

Second leg

Workington were declared Knockout Cup Champions, winning on aggregate 98–82.

Championship Shield
Borders Group

Final Championship Shield Borders Group Table

Northern Group

Final Championship Shield Northern Group Table

Southern Group

Final Championship Shield Southern Group Table

Play-offs

Home team scores are in bold
Overall aggregate scores are in red

Semi-finals

Final

Final leading averages

Teams and final averages
Berwick Bandits

 7.39
 7.63
 7.41
 6.95
 6.48
 6.23
 6.15
 4.00

Edinburgh Monarchs

 9.54
 8.86
 8.63
 7.13
 6.98
 5.89
 5.55
 4.00
 3.64
 3.63
 3.42
 2.60

Glasgow Tigers

 11.05
 8.53
 8.11
 8.07
 7.81
 6.92
 4.74
 3.24
 2.58

Ipswich Witches

 9.25
 9.01
 7.16
 7.10
 5.85
 5.42
 5.00
 4.90
 4.00
 3.72
 3.62
 0.80

Lakeside Hammers

 9.46
 9.41
 8.11
 7.02
 5.97
 5.58
 3.14

Newcastle Diamonds

 7.22
 7.05
 6.77
 6.51
 6.39
 5.96
 5.33
 4.95

Peterborough Panthers

 8.70
 8.66
 7.07
 6.93
 5.80
 5.76
 5.41
 5.16
 3.33

Redcar Bears

 7.85
 7.72
 6.67
 6.39
 5.50
 5.42
 5.19
 5.00
 4.87
 4.18
 4.00

Scunthorpe Scorpions

 9.08
 8.32
 7.94
 7.62
 6.52
 4.29
 1.53

Sheffield Tigers

 8.76
 8.00
 7.69
 6.77
 6.75
 5.81
 4.00
 3.89
 3.81
 3.00
 2.80
 0.89

Workington Comets

 7.91
 7.78
 7.76
 7.66
 7.63
 7.33
 7.23
 1.69

See also
 The top division of British speedway SGB Premiership 2018
 List of United Kingdom speedway league champions
 Knockout Cup (speedway)

References

Championship
Championship
2018